Adrián Carrio (born 1986) is jazz pianist from Oviedo, Spain. He has led his own band, Rendez-Vous Project.

References

External links
 Official website

Living people
People from Asturias
1986 births
People from Oviedo
Spanish jazz pianists
21st-century pianists
21st-century Spanish musicians